The Guŋgañji, also transcribed Gungganyji, Gunggandji, Kongkandji, and other variations, are an Aboriginal Australian people of the state of Queensland.

Language

The Guŋgañji speak Gungay, a dialect of the Yidiny language.

Country
They are rainforest people, living around the Cape Grafton peninsula, west of the Prior Range, and their southern extension runs down to  Palmer Point (Wararitji) and the mouth of Mulgrave River.

Alternative names
 Kunggandji, Kunggandyi
 Kungganji, Kungandji, Koongangie
 Goonganji, Goonganjee
 Gunggay
 Kooganji
 Koo-gun-ji
 Gurugulu

Notes

Citations

Sources

Aboriginal peoples of Queensland